Tina Tower is an Australian businesswoman, entrepreneur, author, world traveller and high performance business consultant. She is the founder of the Begin Bright franchise, a school readiness and primary tutoring centre franchise. In 2014, Tina was the winner of the Australian Telstra Young Business Woman of the Year award.  Tower was named by The Huffington Post as one of the Top 10 Aussie Women to watch in business.

Career
Tower developed a passion for business early attending Robert Kiyosaki and Tony Robbins seminars as a teenager. It was at the mere age of 20 that she started her first business, Reach Education Centre, an educational toy store, birthday party place and tutoring centre. Having completed a Bachelor in Primary Education from University of Sydney, Tower then founded Begin Bright, a school readiness and primary tutoring curriculum in 2008 within her own centres. In 2011, at the age of 27, Tower began the arduous journey of franchising her business, Begin Bright. Begin Bright has franchised centres across New South Wales, Victoria, Western Australia and Queensland. Tower built the franchise to 33 Begin Bright centres across Australia before Cognition Education acquired Begin Bright in 2016, with Tower and her expertise remaining as a member of the Begin Bright Board.

Tower was named in The Educator Magazine Hotlist in 2016 as one of the Top 20 people shaping education in Australia. Tower has also been featured in The Australian Financial Review and Sky News Business Channel. 

In 2017 Tower commenced the role as Entrepreneur in Residence for Business Chicks, Australia’s largest and most influential community for women.  Tower is also a business consultant working with business owners to grow their businesses through tapping into peak performance and with corporates to become more entrepreneurial and innovative through culture improvement and business practices.

In 2017, Tower launched film production company, Nikhedonia Productions with the film option rights to quality book titles and is currently in the process of getting these projects into production.

Using her vast business experience, Tower offers online business courses. The courses are designed to help individuals perform at peak performance and provide tangible tools and strategies to lift business results.

Controversy
In 2016 Tina Tower entered mediation with seven franchise owners over allegations she misled investors. 
An investor named Ms Yu, who holds a masters in teaching, says she abandoned the program because she was too embarrassed to give the worksheets to students because of the many spelling and mathematical errors. “I’ve been able to do better than other franchise owners because I didn’t use the resources, but I’m still paying for a program that’s full of mistakes,” Ms Yu said.

Personal life
In 2005, Tina Tower married Mat Tower in Sydney, Australia. The two share two children together with Kai born 2008 and Cohen in 2009. In 2013 Tower relocated from Sydney to a farm in Northern NSW.

Awards and recognition
 2012 - Winner of My Business Magazine 'Woman in Business' and 'Overall business' winner
 2013 - Winner of Australian Small Business Champions Award for Educational Services
 2014 - Winner of Australian Telstra Young Business Woman of the Year

References

Australian businesspeople
Living people
1984 births